SVG AIR is an airline company located at the Argyle International Airport, Argyle, Saint Vincent and the Grenadines that operates both scheduled and charter flight services within the Eastern Caribbean islands as far north as Jamaica and as far south as Guyana.

St. Vincent and the Grenadines Air or SVG AIR, is a national airline of St. Vincent and the Grenadines, along with Mustique Airways. SVG Air and Mustique Airways have combined to form a SVG Air / Grenadine Air Alliance, operating 17 Aircraft, with bases in St. Vincent, Antigua and Grenada. Offering visitors and residents a wider choice of International Gateways in and out of St. Vincent & the Grenadines.

SVG AIR's main operating base is in St. Vincent but has a maintenance hangar on the island of Bequia and other bases in Barbados, Grenada, Carriacou, Antigua and Barbuda, Montserrat and the Grenadine islands of: Bequia, Canouan and Union Island.

History

The airline was founded in 1990. It began operations with a single leased Britten-Norman Islander. The company is largely owned (75%) by St Vincent Grenada Air and operated by the Gravel and Barnard families.

Fleet 
The SVG Air fleet comprises the following aircraft (as of August 2018):

The SVG Air fleet previously included the following aircraft (as of March 2007):
3 Aero Commander
2 Cessna 402

They have been leasing another Cessna Citation II 550 privately registered J8-JTS, and their own Cessna CE-525B Citation Jet 3 has been registered J8-JET used for charter flights.

Incidents and accidents 

19 November 2006 - SVG Air Aero Commander 500S, disappeared on final approach to Saint Vincent, presumably killing both the pilot and sole passenger. The aircraft's Wreckage was later found in the sea.
22 October 2007 - SVG Cessna 402, registered J8-VBL, with six passengers and a pilot suffered extensive damage when it overran the runway and crashed into the Union Island Airport fence.
5 August 2010 - SVG Cessna 402C Aircraft (J8-SXY) on a flight from Saint Vincent to Canouan crashed off Canouan with only the pilot on board - not found.
29 September 2021—SVG Air Flight 207—a Britten-Norman BN-2B-26 Islander aircraft, operated by SVG Air between, overran the runway at John A. Osborne Airport while on a domestic flight between Antigua and Barbuda and Montserrat. Two of the seven occupants sustained injuries and the airplane was severely damaged.

References

External links
SVG AIR Website - FlySVGAIR
SVG AIR Services
SVG AIR Scheduled Flights
SVG AIR Chartered Flights
SVG AIR Handling Services
SVG AIR Destinations
SVG AIR Contact Page

Airlines of Saint Vincent and the Grenadines
Airlines established in 1990